The 1932 United States Senate election in South Carolina was held on November 8.

On September 13, incumbent Senator Ellison D. Smith defeated former Senator Cole Blease in the Democratic primary with 56.7% of the vote.

At this time, South Carolina was a one-party state, and the Democratic nomination was tantamount to victory. Smith won the November general election without any effort.

Democratic primary

Candidates
Coleman Livingston Blease, former U.S. Senator and Governor of South Carolina
Leon W. Harris, candidate for U.S. Senate in 1930
Ellison D. Smith, incumbent Senator since 1909
Ashton Hilliard Williams, former State Senator from Lake City

Results

Runoff

General election

Campaign
Since the end of Reconstruction in 1877, the Democratic Party dominated the politics of South Carolina and its statewide candidates were never seriously challenged.  Smith did not campaign for the general election as there was no chance of defeat.  Republican Clara Harrigal, an Aiken businesswoman and Republican National Committeewoman, was the first woman to run for statewide office in South Carolina.

Results

|-
| 
| colspan=5 |Democratic hold
|-

See also
List of United States senators from South Carolina
1932 United States Senate elections
1932 United States House of Representatives elections in South Carolina

References

"Supplemental Report of the Secretary of State to the General Assembly of South Carolina." Reports of State Officers Boards and Committees to the General Assembly of the State of South Carolina. Volume I. Columbia, SC: 1933, p. 6.

1932
South Carolina
1932 South Carolina elections